Ananguié (also spelled Ahandjé) is a town in southern Ivory Coast. It is a sub-prefecture of Agboville Department in Agnéby-Tiassa Region, Lagunes District.

Ananguié was a commune until March 2012, when it became one of 1126 communes nationwide that were abolished.

In 2014, the population of the sub-prefecture of Ananguié was 13,786.

Villages
The 8 villages of the sub-prefecture of Ananguié and their population in 2014 are:
 Achi-Brou Ho (415)
 Adahi Kassi Ho (513)
 Adamaho (750)
 Aké-Douanier (618)
 Ananguié (8 980)
 Arrikoho (398)
 Balet Ho (654)
 Essegnon (1 458)

References

Sub-prefectures of Agnéby-Tiassa
Former communes of Ivory Coast